Lewis Newton Wood was a member of the Wisconsin State Assembly.

Biography
Wood was born on January 12, 1799, in Cumberland County, New York. He married Naomi Davis on October 21, 1821. They had eight children. In 1837, Wood graduated from Geneva Medical College.

Wood moved to Big Foot Prairie, Wisconsin, in 1839. In 1856, he relocated to Baraboo, Wisconsin, where he died on March 10, 1868. He was a Baptist.

Career
Wood was a member of the Assembly in 1852. He was Superintendent of Schools of Walworth, Wisconsin. He was a Whig.

References

External links

People from Walworth County, Wisconsin
People from Baraboo, Wisconsin
Members of the Wisconsin State Assembly
Wisconsin Whigs
19th-century American politicians
Physicians from Wisconsin
Geneva Medical College alumni
Baptists from Wisconsin
1799 births
1868 deaths
People from Walworth, Wisconsin
19th-century Baptists